Maiden Trail is a privately owned trail, formerly an unpaved alley, in the Atlanta neighborhood of Virginia-Highland. In 2014, residents cleaned up and beautified the unpaved alley between St. Charles Avenue and Ponce de Leon Avenue, between Frederica and Barnett avenues.

References

External links
Maiden Trail Conservation Group

Hiking trails in Atlanta
Virginia-Highland